Frænfjorden is a fjord in Hustadvika Municipality in Møre og Romsdal county, Norway. The villages of Malme, Sylte, Elnesvågen, Aureosen, and Tornes are all located along the shores of the fjord. There are many small islands scattered throughout the fjord, including the island of Vågøya, where Vågøy Church is located. Other islands include Forøyna, Svinøya, and Bøyna.

See also
 List of Norwegian fjords

References

Hustadvika (municipality)
Fjords of Møre og Romsdal